Football Club Džiugas Telšiai, commonly known as Džiugas Telšiai, or simply as Džiugas, is a Lithuanian association football club based in Telšiai, that competes in the A Lyga, top tier of Lithuanian football.

History 
On the 2 November 1923, sport association Džiugas was established in Telšiai. During the period between 1923–1946, the club had football, basketball, ice hockey teams and expanded to other sports of the city. In 1926, Džiugas merged with another sports club "Laimutė" and had 145 official club members. The first director of the board was S. Lukošius. On the 6 June 1927, the football team played their first game against the Lithuanian bicyclist union which finished 2:2. In 1935, 1936, and 1937, Džiugas became the champions of the Samogitia region. Other participants of the tournament were teams from Plungė, Skouodas, Tauragė and Mažeikiai. Džiugas played their first international game in 1938 against Latvian side "Olimpija" and won 2:1.

In 1946, Džiugas was attached to state-wide sports union "Žalgiris" and the team participated in lower Lithuanian SSR football divisions.

In 1992–1993 season Džiugas became the champions of the III league but in 1994, the team was dissolved and a new Telšai team "Mastis" was formed.

In 2014, the club was reestablished by the football community of Telšiai. In their first season in II lyga (3rd tier), the club won 2nd place and gained promotion to I lyga (2nd tier), and has been participating in it since.

Before the start of the 2019 season, head coach Vijūnas Vasiliauskas was replaced by retired club player Marius Šluta. In 2019, Džiugas won the I Lyga, and gained promotion to the A Lyga. However, the club failed to meet licensing criteria to the A Lyga, and remained in I Lyga for the 2020 season.

They was in 4th position in LFF I Lyga and was promoted to A Lyga. At 2021 season club made debut in A Lyga and was in 8th position.

In the middle of 2022 A Lyga season club changed head coach. João Manuel Lopez Prates replaced Marius Šluta. In their second season in A Lyga they was at 9th place and played relegation play-off against FK Neptūnas. First match in Klaipėda Džiugas Club won 4-0 and second match in Telšiai won 1-0. Aggregate result was 5-0 and they saved place in A Lyga.

Honours

League
 I Lyga
 Winners (1): 2019
II Lyga
 Runners-up (1): 2014

Recent seasons

Current squad

Staff

References

External links 
 Official club site
 A Lyga website
 Futbolinis.lt

 
Football clubs in Lithuania
Sport in Telšiai
1923 establishments in Lithuania
Association football clubs established in 1923